Potomac is a census-designated place (CDP) in Montgomery County, Maryland. It is named after the nearby Potomac River. Potomac is the seventh most educated small town in America, based on percentage of residents with postsecondary degrees. 

In 2011, Bloomberg Businessweek labeled Potomac as the 29th richest ZIP Code in the United States, stating that it had the largest population of any U.S. town with a median income of more than $240,000. In 2012, The Higley Elite 100 published a list of highest-income neighborhoods by mean household income, which included four neighborhoods in Potomac; one of these neighborhoods, "Carderock-The Palisades" was ranked the highest-income neighborhood in the United States, followed by "Beverly Hills-North of Sunset" in Beverly Hills, California and "Swinks Mill-Dominion Reserve" of McLean, Virginia. More recently, two Potomac neighborhoods were ranked among the ten wealthiest neighborhoods in the country by CNBC in 2014. In 2018, data from the American Community Survey revealed that Potomac was the sixth-wealthiest city in the United States. Many Potomac residents work in nearby Washington, D.C. and Northern Virginia.

History 

The land that is now Potomac Village was first settled by Edward Offutt in 1714 after he was granted a  land grant of a region known as Clewerwell by Lord Baltimore. His grant of land was by the Tehogee Indian Trail, an Indian trade route built by the Canaze Indian nation in 1716. Throughout the 18th century, what became known as Offutts Crossroads was a small, rural community which served planters and travelers. In the 19th century, a few small dwellings had been built along with a tavern established in 1820. By the time of the Civil War, the community contained two general stores, a blacksmith shop, and a post office which served a community of 100.

Offutts Crossroads was renamed Potomac in 1881 by John McDonald. An Irishman and veteran of the Civil War, McDonald settled in Potomac around that time. He petitioned for the name change since postal officials were asking for brief names and there were already several other communities in the area with the name "crossroads".

By the turn of the 20th century, Potomac experienced a period of growth. Thomas Perry, an operator of a nearby general store, built a house on the corner of Falls and River Roads in 1902. More residential structures were built on the northern section of Falls Road throughout the 1920s and 1930s. During the 1950s, Potomac was one of many communities in Montgomery County to experience suburbanization because of its proximity to Washington, D.C. Potomac quickly transformed from a rural farming community to a suburban community from the mid- to late 20th century.

Numerous original buildings within Potomac Village have been demolished for the construction of strip malls and modern office buildings. However, in the surrounding area, many of the old farmhouses remain, though some are confined within suburban developments. The Perry Store has been restored and still stands as part of a bank, although the building was moved 21 feet in 1986 to allow for a project to widen the intersection of Falls and River Roads.

Geography
It includes the ZIP Code 20854 for properties and 20859 for US Post Office Boxes.

Climate
The climate is characterized by hot, humid summers and generally mild to chilly winters. According to the Köppen climate classification system, Potomac has a humid subtropical climate, abbreviated "Cfa" on climate maps.

Demographics

As of the 2010 census, there were 44,965 people living in Potomac, including 16,093 households. A 2017 ACS 5-Year Population Estimate  cited 45,780 people living in Potomac. 	

As of 2010, the racial makeup of the CDP was 75.8% White, 4.6% African American, 0.1% Native American, 15.9% Asian, 0.01% Pacific Islander, 0.90% from other races, and 2.6% from two or more races. Hispanic or Latino residents of any race were 6.4% of the population.

Of the 16,093 households, 38.4% included children under the age of 18, 74.8% were married couples living together, 6.6% had a female householder and 16.8% were non-families. Fourteen percent of all households were made up of individuals, and 5.9% were persons living alone who were 65 or older. The average household size was 2.84 and the average family size was 3.10.

In 2019, the median property value in Potomac, MD was $893,000, and the homeownership rate was 87.6%.

In Potomac, the age distribution was 25.3% under the age of 18 (2010), 4.6% from 18 to 24, 21.3% from 25 to 44, 34.0% from 45 to 64 and 13.8% who were 65 or older. The median age was 44. For every 100 females, there were 91.6 males. For every 100 females 18 or older, there were 87.3 males.

Income levels
The median income for a household in the CDP was $187,568 in 2017 dollars. Males had a median income of $100,000+ versus $78,442 for females. About 2.5% of families and 3.3% of the population were below the poverty line, including 3.6% of those under the age of 18 and 3.6% of those 65 and older.

Education

Public schools
Montgomery County Public Schools operates the public schools in the area.
 Bells Mill Elementary School
 Beverly Farms Elementary School
 Cabin John Middle School
 Cold Spring Elementary School
 Herbert Hoover Middle School
 Potomac Elementary School
 Robert Frost Middle School
 Thomas S. Wootton High School
 Wayside Elementary School
 Winston Churchill High School

Private schools
 Bullis School
 German School Washington, D.C.
 McLean School of Maryland
 Norwood School
 The Harbor School

Religious schools
 Connelly School of the Holy Child
 Our Lady of Mercy Catholic School
 St. Andrew's Episcopal School
 The Heights School

Popular culture 
 The Real Housewives of Potomac 
 On January 17, 2016, Bravo's The Real Housewives of Potomac premiered. The show chronicles the lives of two Potomac housewives and four women from neighboring towns. Bravo previously aired The Real Housewives of D.C. in 2010, but the show was never renewed for a second season. Many residents of the town dispute its portrayal in the show.
 Darren Star created the television series Beverly Hills, 90210 based on his experience as a student at Winston Churchill High School in Potomac. Legend has it that Star originally intended to call the show Potomac 20854 before changing the locale to California.

Notable people

References

External links

 
Census-designated places in Maryland
Census-designated places in Montgomery County, Maryland
Maryland populated places on the Potomac River
Upper class culture in Maryland